Mueang Roi Et is the capital district (amphoe mueang) in the western part of Roi Et province, northeastern Thailand.

History 
Mueang Roi Et is an ancient city. The area around the city was made into a district in 1908. In 1913 its name was changed from Pachin Roi Et to Mueang Roi Et.

Geography 
Neighboring districts are (from the north clockwise): Changhan, Chiang Khwan, Thawat Buri, At Samat, Mueang Suang (at a single point), Chaturaphak Phiman and Si Somdet of Roi Et Province; and Mueang Maha Sarakham of Maha Sarakham province.

Administration 
The district is divided into 15 sub-districts (tambons), which are further subdivided into 195 villages (mubans). Roi Et is a town (thesaban mueang) which covers the whole of tambon Nai Mueang. There are a further 14 tambon administrative organizations (TAO).

Missing numbers are tambons which now form the Changhan and Si Somdet Districts.

References

External links

Mueang Roi Et